Mona Müller-Rüster (née Rüster, later Mueck; 10 August 1901 – 13 January 1976) was a German international table tennis player.

Table tennis career
From 1929 to 1934 she won four medals in singles, doubles and team events in the World Table Tennis Championships.

The four World Championship medals included two gold medals in the doubles with Erika Metzger at the 1929 World Table Tennis Championships and team event at the 1933 World Table Tennis Championships.

See also
 List of table tennis players
 List of World Table Tennis Championships medalists

References

German female table tennis players
1901 births
1976 deaths